Mukund Chand Chakrabarti (died 1972) a statistician from Bengal of the British India was the founder head of the department of statistics, University of Mumbai India. He nurtured the department from its birth in 1948 until he died in 1972. The department of mathematics at University of Mumbai was established later in 1963 under the guidance of Professor S. S. Shrikhande.

Chakrabarti was known for his work in design of experiments. He guided a number of students for their Ph.D.s in statistics from University of Mumbai. He was also associated with University of Pune where his notes on design of experiments were taught and he used to come as external examiner for the practical examination.

In 1972, Chakrabarti died of a heart attack in Mumbai.

Select work
 A note on skewness and kurtosis, MC Chakrabarti – Bull Calcutta Soc Math, 1946
 M. C. Chakrabarti, On the C-matrix in design of experiments, J. Indian Statist. Assoc. 1 (1963), 8-23.
 On the use of incidence matrices of designs in sampling from finite populations, MC Chakrabarti – Journal of Indian Statistical Association, 1963
 On the ratio of the mean deviation to standard deviation, MC Chakrabarti – Calcutta Statistical Association Bulletin
 [BOOK] Mathematics of design and analysis of experiments, MC Chakrabarti – 1962 – orton.catie.ac.cr

References

External links
 Encyclopaedia of Design Theory: Bibliography
 Review: M. C. Chakrabarti, Mathematics of Design and Analysis of Experiments

1972 deaths
Indian statisticians
People from Dhaka
University of Dhaka alumni
Year of birth missing
Bengali mathematicians
20th-century Indian mathematicians